The 1924 Nebraska Cornhuskers football team was an American football team that represented the University of Nebraska in the Missouri Valley Conference (MVC) during the 1924 college football season. In its fourth and final season under head coach Fred Dawson, the team compiled a 5–3 record (3–1 against conference opponents), finished second in the MVC, and outscored opponents by a total of 118 to 77. The team played its home games at Memorial Stadium in Lincoln, Nebraska.

Before the season
Despite a bit of a performance dropoff last season, compared to 1921 and 1922, Nebraska was still riding on a wave of success:  Three straight conference titles, two straight defeats of Notre Dame's Four Horsemen (which were also Notre Dame's only losses over the past two seasons), and a modern, new stadium to play their games in.  Coach Dawson was returning for his fourth year, which met or exceeded the length of tenure of all but two of the fifteen coaches preceding him.

Schedule

Roster

Coaching staff

Game summaries

Illinois

Nebraska brought Big 10 co-champion Illinois to Lincoln with aims to make up for losing in Champaign last year.  The game plan focused on stopping Red Grange, who ran all over the Cornhuskers for three touchdowns last year.  The plan was a success, and Grange was mostly neutralized.  Both teams scored early before shutting each other down, and the 6-6 tie continued until late in the fourth quarter.  Finally, Illinois managed a field goal to escape Lincoln with a narrow victory, and narrowed the gap in their series with Nebraska to 2-4.

Oklahoma

The Cornhuskers still had some confidence coming into this game, after the strong showing against the powerhouse Illinois team last week and being perfect against Oklahoma in every game played between the squads.  The Sooners were the better prepared team this day, however, shutting down every aspect of Nebraska's efforts and going ahead 14-0 by the half.  The Cornhuskers tried to recover later in the game but could only come up with 7, and dropped their first game ever to Oklahoma in five meetings.

Colgate

Nebraska was awakened by the stunning loss to Oklahoma and came to life when Colgate came calling at Memorial Stadium as one of the season's eastern opponents.  The Raiders were outplayed and outclassed in nearly every aspect of the game, and the Cornhuskers sent Colgate home in disappointment.  This was the only game ever played between these programs.

Kansas

One of the oldest series in Nebraska history was continued when the Cornhuskers arrived in Lawrence to battle the Jayhawks.  For the entire first half, both teams held each other off, but Kansas finally was overcome in the second half.  The string of frustration that Kansas had endured, never yet winning a home game against Nebraska, was continued yet another year as Kansas fell farther behind in the series to 9-20-2.

Missouri

In one of the most challenging games of the season, Nebraska battled back from an early deficit to topple Missouri in Lincoln.  The Cornhuskers struggled with the Missouri onslaught for most of the first half but somehow kept the Tigers from putting much on the scoreboard for the rest of the game while tacking on some touchdowns of their own.  Although the Tigers went on to win the conference championship, the Cornhuskers were able to lay claim to being the only conference team to hand Missouri a loss, which extended Nebraska's series lead to 14-3-1.

Notre Dame

The series between these teams was becoming legendary, and Knute Rockne's unbeaten Fighting Irish had been waiting all year to avenge their only two losses of the previous two season, both delivered by Nebraska.  It was the final season for the Four Horsemen of Notre Dame, and Nebraska was the one trophy they had yet to win.  Initially it appeared to the Fighting Irish that Nebraska still had their number, as the Cornhuskers jumped to a 6-0 lead in the first quarter.  Following that score, however, Notre Dame focused on shutting down star tackle Ed Weir in order to put points up, and the plan worked as they were able to score 34 straight unanswered points to end Nebraska's winning streak and finally grant the Horsemen a win against the only team ever to defeat them in their entire college careers.  Notre Dame once again took the series lead, 5-4-1.  Rockne was highly complimentary of the Nebraska effort and even visited the Nebraska locker room following the game to shower praise on the disappointed Weir, but publicly tensions were beginning to rise as Notre Dame officials reported inappropriate treatment and an anti-Catholic sentiment displayed by the Nebraska locals.

Kansas State

The Cornhuskers bounced right back from the trouncing delivered by Notre Dame, as they easily handled Kansas State in Manhattan and held them to no points on the day.  The Aggies attempted to find success by emulating the playing styles used by the Fighting Irish to success against Nebraska to no avail, and remained winless in all nine games played between these teams.

Oregon State

Oregon State traveled a great distance for this Thanksgiving Day contest, and put up quite a fight against the Cornhuskers.  After three quarters, both teams still stood without a score, but Nebraska finally broke through in the fourth quarter and managed two touchdowns to silence the visitors, holding them scoreless until the end.  This was the second time these teams had met, the previous contest a 1916 game in Portland, both victories for Nebraska.

After the season
Nebraska and Missouri both ended the season with just a single loss in conference play, and Missouri's only conference loss was dealt to them by the Cornhuskers, however Missouri played more conference games on the season and collected five league wins compared to Nebraska's three, resulting in Missouri claiming the conference title for 1924.  Coach Dawson's final season with Nebraska brought his four-year record to 23-7-2 (.750), a bit of a disappointment from his first two seasons that each had a winning percentage of .875, but his tenure was nonetheless one of a winning coach.  The program's record fell to 197-67-17 (.734), and the conference record fell to 38-4-4 (.870).  Nebraska soon found a new coach, hiring assistant Ernest Bearg from Illinois, who had defeated Nebraska in this and the previous season under the leadership of Robert Zuppke.

References

Nebraska
Nebraska Cornhuskers football seasons
Nebraska Cornhuskers football